Naangu Killadigal is 1969 Indian Tamil-language crime comedy film edited and directed by L. Balu. The film has an ensemble cast including Jaishankar, Anandan, Thengai Srinivasan, Suruli Rajan, Bharathi, Pushpamala and Kumari Padmini. It revolves around four men producing a film, raising funds by committing crimes.

Naangu Killadigal was produced by Modern Theatres and written by A. L. Narayanan. It was released on 25 September 1969.

Plot 

Four ex-convicts come together to produce a film, repeating their crimes of theft to raise funds.

Cast 
Male cast
 Jaishankar as Anandan (a) Kumar
 Anandan as Narendran
 Thengai Srinivasan as Velu (a) Natanam
 Suruli Rajan as Baba (a) Bhai
 Moorthy as Thandavam
 A. L. Narayanan as Tape Singaram
 Sivasooriyan as Bioscope
 Karikol Raju as Santhosh Kumari's father
 Krishna Rao as Narendran's secretary
 Chandran as Alwar
 Ramanathan as Rowdy Varadhan
 Manohar as Ganesan Iyer

Female cast
 Bharathi as Santhosh Kumari
 Pushpamala as Pushpa (a) Pappa
 Kumari Padmini as Prema
 Ramani as Santhosh Kumari's mother

Soundtrack 
Music was by Vedha. Lyrics were written by Kannadasan and A. L. Narayanan.

Release and reception 
Naangu Killadigal was released on 25 September 1969. The Indian Express wrote, "The main defect of the movie is that you do not know where the parody ends and where they are serious. It is very much like the story of a person who cut his nose to spite his face. The movie is like an unrehearsed amateur drama".

References

External links 
 

1960s crime comedy films
1960s satirical films
1960s Tamil-language films
1969 films
Films about filmmaking
Films scored by Vedha (composer)
Indian black-and-white films
Indian crime comedy films
Indian satirical films